Jerzy Dunajski (born February 10, 1957 in Olsztyn) is a Polish sprint canoer who competed in the early 1980s. At the 1980 Summer Olympics in Moscow, he finished fourth in the C-2 500 m event.

References
Sports-Reference.com profile

1957 births
Canoeists at the 1980 Summer Olympics
Living people
Olympic canoeists of Poland
Polish male canoeists
Sportspeople from Olsztyn
20th-century Polish people